Antun "Tova" Stipančić (Duga Resa, 18 May 1949 – Zagreb, 20 November 1991) was a highly accomplished Croatian / Yugoslav professional table tennis player.

Table Tennis career
He was one of the most renowned personalities in the history of the competition, earning him the nickname "the golden left hand of Croatian sport". A table tennis child prodigy who was proclaimed "Best Croatian Sportsman" in 1975, he was National Championship winner numerous times, three times European Champion in doubles, World Champion in men's doubles in 1979  (Stipančić–Šurbek), and World Championship silver medalist in singles in 1975.

Early years 
Antun Stipančić was born in Duga Resa, a small industrial town in central Croatia's Karlovac County (at the time of his birth, and until summer-autumn 1991, Croatia was one of six republics constituting Yugoslavia). His family of five — father Ivan, a janitor at the football club, mother Franca and two younger brothers, Marijan and Ivica — had a difficult time trying to make ends meet. They lived in very modest circumstances in a damp apartment located at the football (soccer) playground which shared its location with the hall of the Table Tennis Club (TTC) "Duga Resa".

At the end of the 1950s, a group of sport enthusiasts led by Josip Trupković, Josip Stojković and Dragutin Vrana brought inspiration to the little-noted town and its young people with a new sport - table tennis. The TTC "Pamučna industrija" was born and its priority was to coach the next generation. 
         
As time passed and word began to spread, more and more curiosity seekers began to visit the table tennis halls to see with their own eyes the Duga Resa youngster, called "the wonder kid". "Tova" Stipančić won his first tournament at the age of 12 in 1961, playing in Karlovac League's cadet category and, a few months later, was the best at Zagreb's "Ribnjak".

Fame at the age of 16

The crucial year was 1965. In that year the famous Japanese expert Ichiro Ogimura visited Duga Resa, leading a strong selection which enraptured the overcrowded table tennis hall. Stipančić recalled that "Ogimura impressed me with his easy way of moving around and attacking although at that time he passed his best days in table tennis". Another direct contact with a great player occurred at the world championships in Ljubljana in which Tova played for the first time. As chosen by lot, or by accident, he had to play against the world champion Zhuang Zedong. He later confessed that his knees could not hold him, but nevertheless he scored some very good points, which brought him compliments from the Chinese champion. He tapped Tova on the shoulder and they were photographed together, despite the lopsided result (8:21, 11:21, 14:21). After a passage of only five years, at the very same Tivoli hall, Stipančić would now be the champion, thoroughly defeating the legendary Chuang Tse Tung.

In 1965, at the age of 16, was no longer a youngster — he grew a few centimeters and became stronger for a few points. At the Open Championships of Poland in Krakow he won his first important international match — in the second round he defeated the European champion Swede Kjell Johanson 24:22 in the fifth set, winning Johanson's two match balls. And as Antun Stipančić firmly stepped forward onto the world table tennis scene,  the highest world authorities agreed that he would have a brilliant career. In 1966 Tova was a member of the national team to the European Championships in Wembley. That year he won two medals on The Youth European Championships in Szombathely — gold, playing mixed doubles with Mirjana Resler and silver, playing doubles with Zlatko Čordaš.

At that point, Tova devoted all his attention to studying and graduating from Textile High School. He succeeded and then felt free to turn all his effort to sport and the excitement that sport brings.

He played with a great deal of enthusiasm at the 1968 Championat de Europe at Lyon Sport Hall. He was very good in team events and still better in a completely unplanned double. The Association at the time made a new combination Korpa - Šurbek which was triumphant in Europe, while Tova, they decided, should play with Edvard Vecko, although they never trained or played before. Tova recalled, "...unburdened, without high pretensions we played you can say for our pleasure. In the final "round" we played against Swedish experts Johanson and Alser who did not lose a single match in two last world championships. We played the whole match offensively, well, firmly. The result went like this, 21:17, 20:22, 22:20 and 21:14! A big applause from the objective spectators in Palais des Sportes was a great reward. What an unforgettable reception at the Pleso airport and again in Duga Resa! I had to make a speech at the improvised platform, everyone was there...."

High points of career as a professional player
During summer 1970 came the unexpected decision, although not so unexpected among table tennis officials: Tova left his "Pamučna industrija" club and became a member of TTC "Vjesnik". The basic reason for moving from the smaller club to the larger one was the need for an adequately strong sparring partner (and none was more suitable than Šurbek or Čordaš), as well as the great challenge of taking part in The European Cup. With the new uniform he put on, there was still another major event: not long afterwards Tova Stipančić was married... As 1971 began, he moved to Zagreb, recalling that "...the new surrounding, new habits, days of great changes... was time for thinking".

The year's end was topped off with a glamorous prize: Stipančić celebrating a first class victory at the International Tournament in Zagreb's "Box of Matches" Hall. Journalists lavished him with headlines - "Tova's Scalping Chinese", "Stipančić Over the Chinese Great Wall", "The Ball Caught Fire". Stipančić smashed Chinese Zhou Lansun and Li Furong, in the semi-finals he defeated Šurbek and, in the finals, the celebrated Zhuang Zedong: 16:21, 21:12 and 21:12, experiencing ecstatic ovations from the overjoyed Zagreb spectators.

In 1972 Zagreb played host to a tournament which brought together the top European table tennis players. It was a complete success in organization and results. It was a top show, with "Europe's Top Twelve" in Zagreb's Trešnjevka sport hall.... and Tova was in the leading role! He broke all the barriers and won the trophy which was presented to him by Reno Vinek, the editor of Sportske Novosti.

On the world stage in 1975-80
In 1975 India built the Netaji Indoor Stadium, a 12,000-seat domed arena, specifically for the World Championships at the Eden Gardens, Kolkata. There, Tova is considered to have played the matches of his life...  At the quarter-finals - a "match for the gourmet" - Hsi En Ting, the title defender left the arena totally defeated by Tova in a rarely seen match, 3:2. In the next game - and it was the semi-final, Antun played against the excellent Japanese defender Takashima. Antun's superior play brought victory in 5 sets !

Then came the long-awaited finals. In the crowded hall, "the war" between 25-year-old Antun Stipančić and the year-younger Istvan Jonyer. It was an excellent opportunity Tova's expertise, but some had doubts. Since Tova had defeated the robust "Hungarian Hussar" only  a few days earlier in the team events, he had a certain psychological advantage, but there was uncertainty whether he would be able to use it. In the first set Jonyer started nervously and "hard", and Stipančić collected points from semi distance, 4:2, 9:5, 13:7, 18:15 and 21:17. There was happiness on Stipančić's bench as the Hungarian seemed nervous and played shackled, while Stipančić was winning his points "by blocking and controlling the situation firmly" winning the second set 21:12. 2:0! But Jonyer succeeded in catching up with Stipančić, 2:2! There was palpable drama in the deciding fifth set! The Zagreb player from Duga Resa inched closer to victory as he led 16:15, 18:17... but Istvan played well, took risks, returned undependable balls, came to 18:20, and then missed one counter ball, 19:20. There was silence in the hall. Again a strong top spin attack, Tova's ball hit the net... Jonyer was the winner, Tova the silver medalist.

In 1979 Tova flew to Pyongyang with his national team to the World Championship in Pyongyang with his national team. "Why not try again?", he explained. "I always fought more with my hand and heart than with my legs" and the medal hunters, the experienced double Šurbek – Stipančić were off to win the table tennis Mount Everest! At the finals of the men's doubles, Tova and Šurba were on one side and two very well known competitors, Hungarian aces Klampar and Jonyer, were on the other. European finals held on Asian grounds. Victory for the Yugoslav team came with 3 sets to 0, and they were acclaimed as table tennis immortals for all time. The victors searched for appropriate words, and Tova, raising his voice said, "Men, I finally experienced it, we are the real champions. Nobody could take us a set."

The following year, at the 1980 European Championships in Bern Tova won two medals playing doubles, but sportswriters pointed out that he showed his true sport greatness in the fifth set. At 19:19 he gave up the ball in favor of the English player Paul Day, although the referee decided the opposite. For that sport gesture he got "The Fair Play Trophy R. Bergmann".

Antun Stipančić died in Zagreb at the age of 42.

Legacy 
Tova was seen as belonging to the entire world. Generations of table tennis players from every continent remember him — whether they played against him or enjoyed his brilliant moves at the green table. With his individuality and outstanding sport results, Tova Stipančić left an indelible trace, becoming part of sport history, of the world, of Croatia and of his Duga Resa.

He won 27 medals, 11 medals from world championships;  1 gold, 4 silver, 6 bronze; and 16 medals from European championships (4,3,9). Additionally, he won 48 medals at international tournaments in all categories.

WORLD CHAMPIONSHIP MEDALS - ( 11 )
TEAM
1969. (München) – 3rd ( bronze medalist ) Šurbek, Korpa
1971. (Nagoya) –  3rd ( bronze medalist ) Šurbek, Karakašević
1975. (Kolkata) – 2nd ( silver medalist ) Šurbek, Karakašević
SINGLE
1973. (Sarajevo) - 3rd ( bronze medalist )
1975. ( Kolkata) - 2nd ( silver medalist )
MEN DOUBLES
1973. (Sarajevo) -  3rd ( bronze medalist ) Šurbek;
1975. (Kolkata) -   2nd ( silver medalist ) Šurbek;
1977. (Birmingham)- 3rd ( bronze medalist ) Šurbek;
1979. (Pyongyang) - 1st ( golden medalist ) Šurbek;
1981. (Novi Sad) -  3rd ( bronze medalist ) Šurbek;
MIXED DOUBLES
1971. (Nagoya) -  2nd (silver medalist ) Alexandru;
EUROPEAN CHAMPIONSHIP MEDALS  - ( 16 )
TEAM
1966. (London) -   3rd ( bronze medalist ) Šurbek;
1968. (Lyon) -     3rd ( bronze medalist ) Šurbek;
1970. (Moscow ) -  2nd ( silver medalist ) Šurbek, Čordaš;
1972. (Rotterdam)- 2nd ( silver medalist ) Šurbek, Čordaš;
1974. (Novi Sad) - 2nd ( silver medalist ) Šurbek, Čordaš;
1976. (Praha) -    1st ( golden medalist ) Šurbek, Jurčič;
SINGLE
1972. (Rotterdam)- 3rd ( bronze medalist )
MEN DOUBLES
1968. (Lyon) -    1st ( golden medalist ) Vecko;
1970. (Moscow)-   1st ( golden medalist ) Šurbek;
1974. (Novi Sad) - 3rd ( bronze medalist ) Šurbek;
1976. (Praha) -   3rd ( bronze medalist ) Šurbek;
1978. (Duisburg)  3rd ( bronze medalist ) Šurbek;
1980. (Bern) -    2nd ( silver medalist ) Šurbek;
MIXED DOUBLES
1974. (Novi Sad) - 3rd ( bronze medalist ) Alexandru;
1976. (Praha) -   1st ( golden medalist ) Palatinuš;
1980. (Bem) -     3rd ( bronze medalist ) Palatinuš;
EUROPEAN CUP ( TEAM )
1972/73. (GSTK "Vjesnik") – 1st
1973/74. (GSTK "Vjesnik") - 1st
1975/76. (GSTK "Vjesnik") - 1st
EUROPE “TOP 12”  ( SINGLE )
1972. (Zagreb)   -  1st
1973. (Böblingen)-  3rd
1975. (Wiena)    -  2nd

See also
 List of table tennis players
 List of World Table Tennis Championships medalists

References

Introduction to the November 2006 Antun "Tova" Stipančić 14th Memorial International Table Tennis Tournament

1949 births
1991 deaths
People from Duga Resa
Sport in Karlovac County
Croatian male table tennis players
Yugoslav table tennis players
Burials at Mirogoj Cemetery